In mathematics, a Cauchy matrix, named after Augustin-Louis Cauchy, is an m×n matrix with elements aij in the form

The Hilbert matrix is a special case of the Cauchy matrix, where

Every submatrix of a Cauchy matrix is itself a Cauchy matrix.

Cauchy determinants 
A subset of its zeros and poles are thus known. The fact is that there are no more zeros and poles:

The determinant of a square Cauchy matrix A is known as a Cauchy determinant and can be given explicitly as
     (Schechter 1959, eqn 4; Cauchy 1841, p. 154, eqn. 10).
It is always nonzero, and thus all square Cauchy matrices are invertible. The inverse A−1 = B = [bij] is given by 
     (Schechter 1959, Theorem 1)
That is, 

with

Generalization
A matrix C is called Cauchy-like if it is of the form

Defining X=diag(xi), Y=diag(yi), one sees that both Cauchy and Cauchy-like matrices satisfy the displacement equation

Hence Cauchy-like matrices have a common displacement structure, which can be exploited while working with the matrix. For example, there are known algorithms in literature for
 approximate Cauchy matrix-vector multiplication with  ops (e.g. the fast multipole method),
 (pivoted) LU factorization with  ops (GKO algorithm), and thus linear system solving,
Here  denotes the size of the matrix (one usually deals with square matrices, though all algorithms can be easily generalized to rectangular matrices).

See also
 Toeplitz matrix
 Fay's trisecant identity

References
 
 
 
 
 
 TiIo Finck, Georg Heinig, and Karla Rost: "An Inversion Formula and Fast Algorithms for Cauchy-Vandermonde Matrices", Linear Algebra and its Applications, vol.183 (1993), pp.179-191.
 Dario Fasino: "Orthogonal Cauchy-like matrices", Numerical Algorithms, vol.92 (2023), pp.619-637. url=https://doi.org/10.1007/s11075-022-01391-y .

Matrices
Determinants